The Washington State Cougars football statistical leaders are individual statistical leaders of the Washington State Cougars football program in various categories, including passing, rushing, receiving, total offense, defensive stats, and kicking. Within those areas, the lists identify single-game, Single season and career leaders. The Cougars represent Washington State University in the NCAA's Pac-12 Conference.

Although Washington State began competing in intercollegiate football in 1894, the school's official record book considers the "modern era" to have begun in 1951. Records from before this year are often incomplete and inconsistent, and they are generally not included in these lists.

These lists are dominated by more recent players for several reasons:
 Since 1950, seasons have increased from 10 games to 11 and then 12 games in length.
 The NCAA didn't allow freshmen to play varsity football until 1972 (with the exception of the World War II years), allowing players to have four-year careers.
 Bowl games only began counting toward single-season and career statistics in 2002. The Cougars have played in seven bowl games since this decision, giving players in those seasons an extra game to accumulate statistics.
 Since Mike Leach took over as head coach in 2012, the Cougars have run a high-octane air raid offense, allowing quarterbacks and wide receivers to rack up many yards and touchdowns. Most notable among these is Connor Halliday, who set an FBS single-game record (since tied) by passing for 734 yards in a 60–59 loss to California in 2014.

These lists are updated through the end of the 2020 season.

Passing

Passing yards

^ Indicates conference record holder for this statistic

^^ Indicates NCAA record holder for this statistic

Passing touchdowns

^ Indicates conference record holder for this statistic

Rushing

Rushing yards

Rushing touchdowns

Receiving

Receptions

^ Indicates conference record holder for this statistic

Receiving yards

Receiving touchdowns

Total offense
Total offense is the sum of passing and rushing statistics. It does not include receiving or returns.

Total offense yards

^ Indicates conference record holder for this statistic

Touchdowns responsible for
"Touchdowns responsible for" is the official NCAA term for combined rushing and passing touchdowns. It does not include receiving or returns.

Defense

Interceptions

^ Indicates conference record holder for this statistic

Tackles

Sacks

Kicking

Field goals made

Field goal percentage

Footnotes

References

Lists of college football statistical leaders by team